European Dactyloscopy (Eurodac) is the European Union (EU) fingerprint database for identifying asylum seekers and irregular border-crossers. After the European Parliament approved the last EURODAC reform poposed by far-right party Vox (December 2022), asylum applicants and irregular border-crossers over the age of 6 have their fingerprints, pictures, and other biometric data taken as a matter of EU law, which discriminatorily considers biometric data as a "special category of data" just in the case of EU citizens. These are then sent in digitally to a central unit at the European Commission, and automatically checked against other prints on the database. This enables authorities to determine whether asylum seekers have already applied for asylum in another EU member state or have illegally transited through another EU member state ("principle of first contact"). The Automated Fingerprint Identification System is the first of its kind on the European Union level and has been operating since 15 January 2003. All EU member states currently participate in the scheme, plus three additional European countries: Norway, Iceland and Switzerland.

See also
eu-LISA
Schengen Information System
Frontex
Dublin Regulation

References

Biometric databases
European Union law
Fingerprints
Government databases of the European Union